The Love Songs is a 2007 (see 2007 in music) album by country singer Clint Black. It consists of newly recorded versions of many of his love songs along with a cover version of Jim Croce's "I'll Have to Say I Love You in a Song".

According to Black, many of the songs remain true to the original version while a few get a slight update. "I wanted to do a record that's not just a reissue of hits", Black said. "Sometimes when I go back and revisit my older recordings, I find little things that, in hindsight, I feel I could improve on just a bit—some new twist that might make it just a little bit better. It might be a slight change in the arrangement, or the way vocals are layered. And there were also times when I listened to a particular recording and felt there really wasn't a change that would make it better."

The album cover was designed by Peter Max and depicts Black with wife Lisa Hartman Black.

Track listing

Personnel 
Band

 Bryan Austin — acoustic guitar, background vocals
 Clint Black — acoustic guitar, harmonica, percussion, electric guitar, lead vocals, background vocals, bass harmonica
 Dane Bryant — piano, keyboards, background vocals
 Lenny Castro — percussion
 Perry Coleman — background vocals
 Steve Dorff — conductor, orchestral arrangements
 Stuart Duncan — fiddle, mandolin
 Paul Franklin — steel guitar
 Dick Gay — drums
 Carl Gorodetzky — concert master
 Lisa Hartman Black — duet vocals on "When I Said I Do" and "Easy for Me to Say"
 Wes Hightower — background vocals
 Carolyn Dawn Johnson — duet vocals on "Our Kind of Love"
 Abraham Laboriel — bass guitar
 Nashville String Machine — orchestra
 Hayden Nicholas — electric guitar
 Dean Parks — acoustic guitar
 Jeff Peterson — steel guitar
 John "J.R." Robinson — drums
 Matt Rollings — grand piano
 Steve Wariner — electric guitar, background vocals
 Jake Willemain — bass guitar
 Martin Young — acoustic guitar

Production
 Zack Berry — production coordinator, assistant engineer
 Clint Black — producer
 Zeke Clark — assistant engineer
 Ricky Cobble — engineer, mixing
 Steve Lockhart — technical support
 Ray Rogers — engineering support
 Hank Williams — mastering

Chart positions

References 

Black Tracks: The Love Songs. ClintBlack.com. Retrieved on January 31, 2007.
[ Artist Chart History (Albums)]. Billboard. Retrieved on September 16, 2007.

2007 compilation albums
Clint Black compilation albums
Equity Music Group compilation albums
Albums produced by Clint Black